Triodanis is a genus of flowering plants within the family Campanulaceae, native to North and South America. Venus' looking-glass is a common name for plants in this genus.

Species include:
Triodanis biflora (Ruiz & Pav.) Greene - small Venus' looking-glass - widespread across North America
Triodanis coloradoensis (Buckley) McVaugh - Colorado Venus' looking-glass - endemic to Texas despite the name
Triodanis holzingeri McVaugh - Holzinger's Venus' looking-glass - Great Plains plus Arizona and Tennessee
Triodanis lamprosperma McVaugh - Prairie Venus' looking-glass - southern Great Plains
Triodanis leptocarpa  (Nutt.) Nieuwl. - Slimpod Venus' looking-glass - Great Plains 
Triodanis perfoliata  (L.) Nieuwl. - Clasping Venus' looking-glass - widespread across North and South America from Canada to Argentina; naturalized in China, Korea, Australia
Triodanis texana McVaugh  - Texas Venus' looking-glass - endemic to Texas

References

External links
Triodanis - Ecoport

Campanuloideae
Campanulaceae genera